Flesselles can refer to:
 The town of Flesselles, Somme, in France
 Jacques de Flesselles (1721 – 14 July 1789), provost of Paris assassinated during the storming of the Bastille
 The Flesselles balloon, 1784 of Joseph Montgolfier, named after the above as promoter of the subscription list.